Corky's Debt to His Father is the only solo LP by Red Krayola leader Mayo Thompson. Recorded in 1970, it was released on the small independent label Texas Revolution but barely distributed at the time; some copies were made available in the 1970s via mail order.

Texas Revolution was a short-lived independent record label. Mayo Thompson remarked the plans they had before the label's demise sometime in 1971: "We were going to make records of the news.  We were going to put the newspaper to music, and sell it on street corners.  Like make it in one day, press it, and sell it the next week.  Topical songs, sold out of the back of a truck. All the things that we've later come to see - indie music, the DIY scene, all that stuff.

The album was out of print for a number of years, during which time one song - "Horses" - was re-recorded by Pere Ubu; Thompson was a member of the group at the time. The album was re-released in the mid-eighties on the English label Glass. It was later reissued again, on vinyl and CD, through Drag City.

Background

After the Red Krayola disbanded in 1968, Mayo Thompson returned to Walt Andrus' Studio (the best studio in Houston at the time) with various Nashville session musicians. Corky's Debt To His Father was recorded and released in 1970 on independent record label Texas Revolution.

Critical reception
The New Yorker called Corky's Debt to His Father "an emblematic cult record, twisting the ears of a fervent few." The Chicago Reader wrote that "the music has an easy, folksy feel, the crack band laying down a down-home ambience that's unkempt in a precise way." LA Weekly called it "an overlooked collection of cracked and arty folk songs that set the template for lo-fi, indie-pop styles decades later." Trouser Press deemed it "a left-field version of a blues and neo-vaudeville album [that is] played mostly acoustic on slide guitar, piano, bass and elementary traps, with some horns and electricity."

In a retrospective review Richie Unterberger assessed the record as being "more palatable to pop ears than any of Thompson's numerous Red Krayola records" as well as appraising it as "an eclectic folk-rock base that bore some rough similarities to Syd Barrett's work".

Jeff Mangum of Neutral Milk Hotel has been cited as being a huge fan of the record. In 2019, he attended a live performance of Mayo Thompson's solo album at (Le) Poisson Rouge.

Track listing

Personnel

Mayo Thompson - vocals, guitar, bass, production
Frank Davis - production, engineering, fiddle guitar, timpani
Roger Romano - production, engineering, percussion
Joe Duggan - piano
Mike Sumler - slide guitar, bass, tenor saxophone
Le Anne Romano - baritone saxophone
Chuck Conway - drums, bongos, percussion
Jimi Newhouse - drums
Carson Graham - drums
The La La's - backing vocals
The Whoaback Singers - backing vocals

Covers

Pere Ubu covered "Horses" in 1980.

Lower Dens covered "Dear Betty Baby" in 2011.

References

External links
 Mayo Thompson - Corky's Debt To His Father

Mayo Thompson albums
1970 debut albums
Drag City (record label) albums
Albums produced by Mayo Thompson